Cystiscus yasawaensis is a species of very small sea snail, a marine gastropod mollusk or micromollusk in the family Cystiscidae.

Description

The shell can grow to be 2.2 mm in length.

Distribution
Cystiscus yasawaensis can be found off the coast of Fiji.

References

Cystiscidae
Gastropods described in 2006
Yasawaensis